John Light Atlee (November 2, 1799 – October 1, 1885) was an American physician and surgeon. He was one of the organizers of the American Medical Association, also serving as its president.

Background
Atlee was born in Lancaster County, Pennsylvania, the son of Colonel William Pitt Atlee. He graduated from the University of Pennsylvania School of Medicine in 1820, after which he opened an office in Lancaster and his skill as a surgeon soon brought him into prominence.

He helped found the Lancaster County Medical Society in 1843 and the Pennsylvania State Medical Society in 1848. He was also one of the promoters of and organizers of the American Medical Association in Philadelphia. In 1868 he became a vice president of the A.M.A., and in 1882 he served as its president. He was also professor of anatomy at Franklin and Marshall College, where a dormitory now bears his name. He died in Lancaster in 1885.

References 

19th-century American physicians
1799 births
1885 deaths
Perelman School of Medicine at the University of Pennsylvania alumni
American surgeons
People from Lancaster, Pennsylvania
Presidents of the American Medical Association